Amistad National Recreation Area is a national recreation area managed by National Park Service (NPS) that includes the area around the Amistad Reservoir at the confluence of the Rio Grande, the Devils River, and the Pecos River near Del Rio in Val Verde County, Texas. The reservoir was created by the Amistad Dam (Presa de la Amistad in Spanish), completed in 1969, located on the Rio Grande at the United States-Mexico border across from the city of Ciudad Acuña in the Mexican state of Coahuila. Amistad, Spanish for "friendship," refers broadly to the close relationship and shared history between Ciudad Acuña and Del Rio.

Recreational activities
The lake given its location is the backdrop for year-round, water-based recreation opportunities, including boating, fishing, swimming, scuba diving and water-skiing. Houseboats and other boating equipment can be rented from the park unit's concessionaires. Amistad National Recreation Area in addition provides opportunities for picnicking, hiking, camping and hunting. The area is rich in archeology and rock art, and contains a wide variety of plant and animal life. In the fall, monarch butterflies by the thousands pass through the area during their 3,000 mile (4,800 km) migration from southern Canada to central Mexico.

There are opportunities for hunting as provided for under state and federal law at Amistad given its status as a recreation area. Bow-hunting for white-tailed deer, javelina, turkey, rabbit, mouflon sheep, aoudad sheep, blackbuck antelope and feral hog is permitted during certain times of the year in prescribed hunt areas. Though rifles and handguns are not permitted, shotguns may be used to hunt dove, quail, duck and rabbit in accordance with relevant regulations.

Elite scuba divers have begun to explore the system of deep underwater caves beneath the surface of the reservoir. The dive requires exotic gas mixes, pre-placement of gas cylinders, and extensive decompression times at depth. These caves are considered hazardous and should not be attempted by anyone without extensive training and preparation.

Administrative history
The National Park Service initially managed the site as the Amistad Recreation Area under a cooperative agreement with the International Boundary and Water Commission effective November 11, 1965. Amistad was reauthorized as a national recreation area and NPS park unit on November 28, 1990.

Gallery

References

External links

 Official NPS site: Amistad National Recreation Area
Archival film footage of the Amistad Dam and Reservoir from the Texas Archive of the Moving Image

Mexico–United States border
Protected areas established in 1965
Protected areas of Val Verde County, Texas
Rio Grande
National Park Service areas in Texas
National Park Service National Recreation Areas
International lakes of North America